The 1997 DFB-Ligapokal Final decided the winner of the 1997 DFB-Ligapokal, the 1st edition of the reiterated DFB-Ligapokal, a knockout football cup competition.

The match was played on 26 July 1997 at the Ulrich-Haberland-Stadion in Leverkusen. Bayern Munich won the match 2–0 against VfB Stuttgart for their 1st title.

Teams

Route to the final
The DFB-Ligapokal is a six team single-elimination knockout cup competition. There are a total of two rounds leading up to the final. Four teams enter the preliminary round, with the two winners advancing to the semi-finals, where they will be joined by two additional clubs who were given a bye. For all matches, the winner after 90 minutes advances. If still tied, extra time, and if necessary penalties are used to determine the winner.

Match

Details

References

1997
FC Bayern Munich matches
VfB Stuttgart matches
1997–98 in German football cups